re:power, formerly Wellstone Action (stylized in all lowercase), is a 501(c)(4) progressive advocacy organization founded by longtime political operative Jeff Blodgett. Based in Minnesota, it trains community organizers, student activists, campaign staff, progressive candidates and elected officials. The organization was originally named after Paul Wellstone, a U.S. Senator who died in a plane crash along with his wife, Sheila, and daughter, Marcia, on October 25, 2002. After Wellstone's death, his surviving children and former campaign manager founded the group to carry on Wellstone's populist approach to progressive politics.

Tim Walz, elected to represent Minnesota's 1st congressional district in 2006, was the progressive training program's first successful candidate at the federal level. Mark Ritchie, Minnesota's former Secretary of State, is a Wellstone Action alum.

In May 2018, it was reported that that organization's board of directors had voted to remove Wellstone's two sons from their directorial positions after they raised questions about the financial activities of the organization. There was also a dispute over the direction and priorities of the group. Following the removal of Wellstone's sons from the organization's board of directors, Wellstone Action was rebranded as "re:power".

References

External links
 

Political organizations based in the United States
Non-profit organizations based in Minnesota
Progressive organizations in the United States
Organizations established in 2002
501(c)(4) nonprofit organizations
2002 establishments in Minnesota